William Borradaile (10 July 1792 – 16 March 1838) was an English amateur cricketer who played first-class cricket from 1815 to 1832.  Mainly associated with Marylebone Cricket Club (MCC), he made 3 known appearances in first-class matches.  He played for the Gentlemen in the 1832 Gentlemen v Players match.

References

1792 births
1838 deaths
English cricketers
English cricketers of 1787 to 1825
English cricketers of 1826 to 1863
Gentlemen cricketers
Marylebone Cricket Club cricketers
Epsom cricketers